The BET Award for Best Male Hip Hop Artist is an award given to honor the outstanding achievements of male artists in hip hop every year. The winner is determined based on sales and overall quality of content released within the eligibility period. Kendrick Lamar is the all-time winner in this category with five wins. Drake has the most nominations with twelve.

Winners and nominees
Winners are listed first and highlighted in bold.

2000s

2010s

2020s

Multiple wins and nominations

Wins

 5 wins
 Kendrick Lamar

 4 wins
 Drake

 3 wins
 Kanye West

 2 wins
 Jay-Z
 T.I.

Nominations

 13 nominations
 Drake

 10 nominations
 Jay-Z

 9 nominations
 J. Cole

 8 nominations
 Kanye West

 7 nominations
 Kendrick Lamar

 6 nominations
 Future

 5 nominations
 Lil Wayne
 Ludacris

 4 nominations
 50 Cent
 Snoop Dogg
 T.I.

 3 nominations
 Big Sean
 Common
 Lil Baby
 Rick Ross

 2 nominations
 B.o.B
 Busta Rhymes
 DaBaby
 Jack Harlow
 Ja Rule
 Nelly
 Travis Scott
 Young Jeezy

See also
 BET Award for Best Female Hip Hop Artist

References

BET Awards
Hip hop awards